Eupithecia fortis is a moth in the family Geometridae. It is found in south-western China (Yunnan).

References

Moths described in 2004
fortis
Moths of Asia